Newnham or Newnham on Severn is a village in west Gloucestershire, England. It lies in the Royal Forest of Dean, on the west bank of the River Severn, approximately 10 miles south-west of Gloucester and three miles southeast of Cinderford. It is on the A48 road between Gloucester and Chepstow, Monmouthshire, Wales. The village has a parish council.

A parish church was established in the 14th century (although there had been a chapel of ease since 1018), and in 1366 a new church building was built on the high ground of the village as the old one faced erosion from the river. The new building has itself been damaged by a gunpowder explosion in 1644 during the English Civil War and a fire in 1881, but is still in use.

The Ancient Romans built three roads through the location, where they forded the River Severn. The Anglo-Saxons established a permanent settlement, the Normans built a motte-and-bailey fortification for defence, and in medieval times it became a major port with links around Great Britain and Ireland. In 1171, Henry II of England staged an invasion of Ireland from Newnham. One account claimed that he set sail with 400 ships and 5,000 men, which suggests its importance as a port. For a time Newnham was the most successful Gloucestershire town west of the Severn. Its role as a port and trading hub declined, however, rapidly with the 1827 opening of the Gloucester and Sharpness Canal.

In 1810, an early attempt at a Severn tunnel began construction just south of Newnham. Work was abandoned after flooding in 1812.

Matron Eva Luckes of The London Hospital lived in Newnham.

The scenic Gloucester to Newport railway line goes through a tunnel here.  Newnham railway station opened in 1851 and closed in 1964.

Governance
The civil parish is part of Newnham and Westbury electoral ward. This ward starts in the north at Westbury-on-Severn and then follows the River Severn to Newnham. The total population of the ward taken at the 2011 census was 3,088.

References

External links

 Photographs of St Peter's Church
 Local information from the Royal Forest of Dean website.
 Parish council
BBC archive film of Newnham from 1984
Photos of Newnham on Severn and surrounding area on geograph.org.uk
Newnham on Severn Village Web site
Aerial pictures of Newnham

Villages in Gloucestershire
Populated places on the River Severn
Civil parishes in Gloucestershire
Forest of Dean